Heroic Legend of the Yang's Family (碧血青天楊家將) is a 30-episode 1994 Hong Kong TV series produced by ATV, based on the legendary Generals of the Yang Family.

Plot
In a fierce battle against the invading army of its neighboring country Liao, Song's main force, the famous Yang's Troop, suffers a complete defeat due to failure of prompt backup from its General in Chief Pong Loong, who is jealous of the Yangs of their military honors. Later, in the investigation over the defeat, the Justice Pao finds solid evidence against Loong of his fraternization with Liao, which leads to the execution of Loong, and thus arouses hatred between Yang's Family and Loong's father, the Grand Tutor Pong.

Realizing his identity as a Yang's offspring after being out of contact with the Yangs for ages, Liao General Yollig Chung-Yuen returns to the land of Song for a reunion with his own birth parents. Seeing it a chance to maliciously revenge on the Yangs, Pong strives for the execution of Chung-Yuen. After his evil plan is destroyed by Justice Pao, Pong decides to vent his hatred on another Yang's member Chung-Po by framing him as a rebel, aiming to have the whole Yang's Family executed as traitors.

As the war between Song and Liao becomes more intense, the female warriors of Yang's put aside their personal hatred and set out for safeguard against the invaders. Unknowing that the Grand Tutor Pong has fraternized with Liao, the Yang's Army gets trapped and surrounded by the enemy and is facing a life-and-death situation....

Cast
 Note: The characters' names are in Cantonese romanisation.
Norman Chui as Yeung Jung-bou
Jin Chao-chun as Baau Ching (Cantonese voice by Tam Bing-man)
Paul Chun as Pong Hung
Yan Chi-keung as Jin Chiu
Choi Hiu-yi as Consort Pong
Lee Yun-ki as Yeung Man-gwong
Wong Yim-na as Wai Ling-yi
Ben Ng as Ye-leut Jung-yun
Sin Ho-ying as Pong Lung
Berg Ng as Pong Fu
Mak Ging-ting as Muk Gwai-ying
Poon Chi-man as Emperor Yan-jung of Sung
Lee Heung-kam as Se Choi-fa
Yam Bing-yee as Princess Dik
Kingdom Yuen as Yeung Paai-fung
Paw Hee-ching as Princess Chaai
Szema Wah Lung as Chancellor Wong
Chan Li-wan as Yeung Baat-mui ("8th sister")
Tam Siu-ying as Yeung Gau-mui ("9th sister")
Wang Ching-ho as Yeung Hung
Tsang Wai-ming as Jiu Ting-gwai
Keung Ho-men as Maang Ding-gwok
Fung Kwok as Gung-syun Chaak
Tsang Chan-on as Wong Chiu
Cheng Yin as Ma Hon
Chao Siu-lun as Jeung Lung
Chow Wai-lun as Jiu Fu
Eddy Ko as Yeung Yin-chiu

References
Product on Amazon.com

Asia Television original programming
Works based on The Generals of the Yang Family
Television series set in the Northern Song
Television series set in the Liao dynasty
Fictional depictions of Bao Zheng in television
Television shows set in Kaifeng